Casa Amadeo, antigua Casa Hernández is the oldest, continuously-occupied Latin music store  in New York City, and the Bronx, having opened in 1941.

Casa Amadeo is located in a historic apartment building  located in the Longwood section of The Bronx, New York. Designed by James F. Meehan, the apartment building was built in 1905 and named The Manhaset.  The building is a six-story, Neo-Renaissance style building with commercial storefronts on the first floor.  The lower two stories are faced with rusticated stone and the upper floors in red brick. It features a projecting entrance porch flanked by Corinthian order columns. The building is managed by local grassroots organization Banana Kelly, which has rehabilitated and maintained buildings in Longwood since the 1970s.

History
The first Puerto Rican owned music store in New York City, Almacenes Hernández was founded by Victoria Hernández and her brother Rafael Hernández at 1724 Madison Avenue in 1927. Almacenes Hernández was sold to record producer Luis Cuevas in 1939.

The second music store founded by the siblings, Casa Hernández, was founded in 1941. It was sold in 1969 to musician and composer Miguel Angel "Mike" Amadeo, who renamed it Casa Amadeo, antigua Casa Hernández. Mike Amadeo still owns and operates the music store.

It was listed on the National Register of Historic Places in 2001.

Miguel Angel Amadeo

Miguel Angel Amadeo, better known as "Mike" Amadeo, is a Puerto Rican musician and owner of the Casa Amadeo music store in the Bronx. Amadeo, born in Bayamon, Puerto Rico is the son of composer Alberto "Titi" Amadeo, a musician who played with Cuban bandleader Desi Arnaz for NBC. He is the uncle of Grammy Award-nominated musician Tito Nieves. Mike Amadeo is a prolific composer, with nearly 300 songs to his credit, performed by artists such as Celia Cruz, Danny Rivera, and Cheito Gonzalez.

In 1954 Amadeo took a trip to Puerto Rico. While there he met pianist Rafael Ithier, who was working for bandleader Rafael Cortijo. When Cortijo's group fell apart, Ithier formed El Gran Combo de Puerto Rico, and Amadeo began contributing music to the Gran Combo, including Amadeo's best known song - Que Me Lo Den en Vida  (Give it to Me in Life).

Back in New York City, Amadeo joined Alegre Records, and associated with the first generation of Nuyorican musicians including 
Johnny Pacheco, Ray Barretto and the brothers Eddie Palmieri, and Charlie Palmieri.

With his long residency, and personal connections to the Latin music community, Mike Amadeo is known as a community historian. For his contributions to Puerto Rican music and the Bronx, Mike Amadeo has been honored by the National Puerto Rican Day Parade in 2008, a Hostos Center for the Arts & Culture concert in 2005, and by the Bronx Council on the Arts in 2010. In 2014, the corner of Logwood Avenue and Prospect Avenue was renamed Miguel Angel "Mike" Amadeo Way.

See also
 Alegre Records
 Fania Records
 Rafael Hernández Marín
 El Gran Combo de Puerto Rico
 Playground 52

References

External links
 Archived version of the Casa Amadeo website
 FaceBook page
 NY Daily News article - South Bronx store Casa Amadeo remains the go to spot for Latin music fans
 NY Times article - Honoring Pop and his palace of Latin Soul in the Bronx
 Neighborhood Slice Season 1: Ep. 6 - South Bronx, The Bronx
 National Register of Historic Places - Bronx County, New York

Residential buildings on the National Register of Historic Places in New York City
1941 establishments in New York City
Residential buildings in the Bronx
National Register of Historic Places in the Bronx
Longwood, Bronx
Puerto Rican culture in New York City
Music organizations based in Puerto Rico
20th-century American composers
Companies based in the Bronx